DJ-Kicks: Rockers Hi-Fi (also known as DJ-Kicks: The Black Album) is a DJ mix album, mixed by Rockers Hi-Fi. It was released on 19 May, 1997 on the Studio !K7 independent record label as part of the DJ-Kicks series.

The album was compiled and mixed by Rockers Hi-Fi, with additional vocals by MC Farda P.

Allmusic described the album as "a smart, thrilling ride into the minds and record collection of Rockers Hi-Fi", with an overall feel of "cinematic dub". M. Tye Comer, reviewing the album for CMJ New Music Monthly, described it as "an adventurous, entertaining, and mesmerizing record".

Track listing
 "Rockers Intro" - Farda P  – 0:05
 "Theme From Kung Fu" - Jeff Danna  – 2:15
 "He Builds The World" - Small Fish with Spine  – 6:20
 "Feel" - Kid Loops  – 5:07
 "Candles & Versions" - Wraparound Sounds  – 4:04
 "Up Through The Down Pipe" - DJ Grizzly  – 4:02
 "Dub Angel" - Snooze vs DJ Cam  – 1:58
 "Varispeed" - Electric J  – 5:40
 "Callacop" - Deep Space Network  – 2:59
 "Long Life" - Prince Far I And The Arabs  – 4:38
 "Com-unique-ation" - Cee-Mix  – 6:34
 "Never Tell You (featuring Tikiman) - Rhythm & Sound  – 5:47
 "Twisted System" (Ruts D.C. Dub) - Terminalhead & Mr. Spee  – 4:42
 "g13" - T Power  – 0:51
 "Saidisyabruklinmon" - Dr. Israel vs. Loop  – 4:51
 "Bad Head Day" (Subtropic Cut It Up mix) - Lida Husik  – 4:55
 "Dis Ya One" - More Rockers  – 6:32
 "Rockers Outro" - Farda P  – 0:30
 "The Black Single" (DJ-Kicks Rockers Hi-Fi mix) - Farda P  – 4:06

References

External links 
DJ-Kicks website

Black Album
1997 compilation albums